Roger Boyle, 1st Earl of Orrery (25 April 1621 – 16 October 1679), styled Lord Broghill from 1628 to 1660, was an Anglo-Irish soldier and politician who sat in the House of Commons of England at various times between 1654 and 1679. Boyle fought in the Irish Confederate Wars (part of the Wars of the Three Kingdoms) and subsequently became known for his antagonism towards Irish Catholics and their political aspirations. He was also a noted playwright and writer on 17th-century warfare.

Background
Boyle was the third surviving son of Richard Boyle, 1st Earl of Cork and his second wife, Catherine Fenton, daughter of Sir Geoffrey Fenton of Dublin. He was named after his parents' first son who had died at age nine. He was created Baron of Broghill in the Peerage of Ireland on 28 February 1628, a few months before his 7th birthday. Boyle was educated at Trinity College, Dublin in 1630; and at Gray's Inn in 1636. From 1636 to 1639 he travelled abroad in France, Switzerland and Italy and then took part in the Bishops Wars against the Scots on returning home.

Rebellion and civil war
Boyle returned to Ireland on the outbreak of the rebellion in 1641 and fought with his brothers against the Irish rebels at the battle of Liscarroll in September 1642. Boyle and the English in Ireland were left vulnerable by the outbreak of the English Civil War. Although initially under the command of the Royalist Marquis of Ormonde (later James Butler, 1st Duke of Ormonde), Lord Broghill consented to serve under the parliamentary commissioners in Cork against the Irish Confederates. Boyle fought with the Parliamentarians until the execution of the king, when he retired altogether from public affairs and took up his residence at Marston in Somerset.

Subsequently, he originated a scheme to bring about the Restoration. On his way abroad to consult with King Charles II, he was unexpectedly visited by Oliver Cromwell in London. Cromwell informed him that his plans were well known to the council and warned against persisting in them. Cromwell offered him a command in Ireland against the rebels that entailed no obligation except faithful service. It was accepted.

Boyle's assistance in Ireland proved invaluable during the Cromwellian conquest of Ireland. Appointed master of the ordnance, he soon assembled a body of infantry and horse, driving the rebels into Kilkenny, where they surrendered; he induced the Royalist garrison of Cork (English troops with whom he had served earlier in the wars) to defect back to the Parliamentarian side. On 10 May 1650, he completely defeated at Macroom a force of Irish advancing to the relief of Cork. On Cromwell's departure for Scotland, Boyle cooperated with Henry Ireton, whom he joined at the siege of Limerick. In 1651 he defeated an Irish force marching to Limerick's relief under Lord Muskerry at the battle of Knocknaclashy, the final battle of the Irish Confederate Wars, thus effecting the capture of the town.

By this time Broghill had become a fast friend and follower of Cromwell, whose stern measures in Ireland and support of the English and Protestants were welcomed after the policy of concession to the Irish initiated by Charles I. He was returned as member for the county of Cork in 1654 to the First Protectorate Parliament and in 1656 to the Second Protectorate Parliament and also in the latter assembly for Edinburgh, for which he elected to sit. He served this year as Lord President of the Council in Scotland, where he won much popularity. He lodged in Edinburgh at Old Moray House. When he returned to England he was included in the inner cabinet of Cromwell's council, and nominated in 1657 as a member of the new House of Lords. He was one of those most in favour of Cromwell's assumption of the royal title, and proposed a union between the Protector's daughter Frances and Charles II.

Restoration
On Oliver Cromwell's death, Boyle gave his support to Richard Cromwell; but as he saw no possibility of maintaining the government, he left for Ireland, whereby resuming command in Munster he secured the island for Charles, anticipating Monk's overtures by inviting the King to land at Cork. In 1660, he was elected MP for Arundel in the Convention Parliament, although he was busily engaged in Ireland at the time of the election. On 5 September 1660 he was created Earl of Orrery. The same year he was appointed one of the three Lord Justices (Ireland) and drew up the Act of Settlement 1662. In 1661, he was re-elected MP for Arundel in the Cavalier Parliament. He founded the town of Charleville, County Cork, near his estate at Broghill. However, his mansion house in Broghill was burned down by Irish forces before the end of the century.

He continued to exercise his office as lord-president of Munster till 1668, when he resigned it on account of disputes with the duke of Ormonde, the lord-lieutenant.  On 25 November, he was impeached by the House of Commons for "raising of money by his own authority upon his majesty's subjects," but the prorogation of parliament by the king interrupted the proceedings, which were not afterwards renewed. In 1673 he was appointed Custos Rotulorum of County Limerick, which position he held until his death.

Boyle's writings
In addition to Lord Orrery's achievements as a statesman and administrator, he gained some reputation as a writer and a dramatist. He was the author of:
An Answer to a Scandalous Letter ... A Full Discovery of the Treachery of the Irish Rebels (1662), printed with the letter itself in his State Letters (1742)
Another answer to the same letter entitled Irish Colors Displayed ... also ascribed to him
Parthenissa, a novel (1651, 1654–56, 1669)
English-Adventures by a Person of Honor (1676), from which Otway drew his tragedy of the Orphan
A Treatise of the Art of War (1677), a work of considerable historical value

There are some poems, of little interest, including verses:
On His Majesty's Happy Restoration (unprinted)
On the Death of Abraham Cowley (1677)
The Dream (unprinted)
Poems on most of the Festivals of the Church (1681)
Plays in verse, of some literary but less dramatic merit:
Henry V (1664), heroic drama
The Generall (1664), a tragi-comedy. Samuel Pepys, 4 October 1664, called it "so dull and so ill-acted, that I think it is the worst I ever saw or heard in all my days."
Mustapha (1665), tragedy
Tryphon : a tragedy (acted 1668, Printed for H. Herringman, 1669)
The Black Prince (acted 1667; printed 1669), heroic drama
Herod the Great (published 1694 but unacted), tragedy
Altemira (1702), tragedy
Guzman (1669), comedy
Mr. Anthony (1690), comedy

A collected edition was published in 1737, to which was added the fourth earl's comedy As you find it. The General is also attributed to him.

Family  
Boyle was a brother of Robert Boyle.

Boyle married Lady Margaret Howard, 3rd daughter of Theophilus, 2nd Earl of Suffolk, whose charms were celebrated by Suckling in his poem "The Bride". By her he had besides five daughters, two sons, of whom the eldest, Roger (1646 –1681/1682), succeeded as 2nd Earl of Orrery. His daughter, Elizabeth, married Folliott Wingfield, 1st Viscount Powerscourt. Two other children, Henry and Margaret, married children of Murrough O'Brien, 1st Earl of Inchiquin; Henry was the father of Henry Boyle, 1st Earl of Shannon.

References

Authorities

 Additional manuscripts (Brit. Mus.) 25,287 (letter-book when governor of Munster), and 32,095 sqq. 109–188 (letters);
 Article in the Oxford Dictionary of National Biography (2002)

External links
 
 
Stirnet: Boyle03
The Peerage: Roger Boyle, 1st Earl of Orrery

|-

1621 births
1679 deaths
17th-century Irish people
17th-century soldiers
Roger
Cavaliers
Members of the Privy Council of Ireland
Boyle
Politicians from County Cork
Roundheads
17th-century English dramatists and playwrights
17th-century male writers
English MPs 1654–1655
English MPs 1656–1658
English MPs 1660
English MPs 1661–1679
Peers of Ireland created by Charles I
Younger sons of earls
Impeached British officials
1st
Members of Cromwell's Other House